This is a list of the first women lawyer(s) and judge(s) in Wyoming. It includes the year in which the women were admitted to practice law (in parentheses). Also included are women who achieved other distinctions such becoming the first in their state to graduate from law school or become a political figure.

Firsts in Wyoming's history

Lawyers 

 First female: Grace Raymond Hebard (1898) 
First female to argue a case before the Wyoming Supreme Court: Laura Bicknell Harris in 1927 
First female (prosecutor): Nancy Guthrie in 1978

State judges 

 First female (justice of the peace): Esther Hobart Morris in 1870 
 First female (county judge): Betty Kail (1953) in 1981 
 First female (district court): Betty Kail (1953) in 1983
 First female (Wyoming Supreme Court): Marilyn S. Kite in 2000

Federal judges 
First female (U.S. District Court for the District of Wyoming): Nancy D. Freudenthal (1980) in 2010

Attorney General of Wyoming 

 First female: Gay Woodhouse (1977) from 1999-2001

Deputy Attorney General 

 First female: Ellen Crowley Suyematsu in 1959

County Attorney 

 First female: Nancy Guthrie in 1978

Political Office 

 First Native American (female) (Wyoming Senate): Affie Ellis in 2017

Wyoming Bar Association 

 First female (president): Catherine "Cathy" McPherson from 2000-2001

Firsts in local history 

 Nancy Guthrie: First female to serve as the County Attorney in Big Horn County, Wyoming (1978)
 Mary B. Guthrie: First female to serve as the City Attorney for Cheyenne, Wyoming [Laramie County, Wyoming]
 Lucky McMahon: First female to serve as the County Attorney for Sublette County, Wyoming (2008)
 Erin Weisman: First female to serve as the County Attorney for Teton County, Wyoming (2018)

See also 

 List of first women lawyers and judges in the United States
 Timeline of women lawyers in the United States
 Women in law

References  

Lawyers, Wyoming, first
Wyoming, first
Women, Wyoming, first
Women, Wyoming, first
Women in Wyoming
Wyoming lawyers
Lists of people from Wyoming